Rəhimli is a village in the Kalbajar District of Azerbaijan.

History 
The village was occupied by Armenian forces during the First Nagorno-Karabakh war and administrated as part of Shahumyan Province of the self-proclaimed Republic of Artsakh.

On 25 November 2020, the village was returned to Azerbaijan per the 2020 Nagorno-Karabakh ceasefire agreement.

References

External links 

Populated places in Kalbajar District